The Very Best of Dokken is a greatest hits album by the American heavy metal band Dokken. Released on Rhino Records, this compilation contains most of Dokken's singles prior to 1995, the year this compilation was released. This compilation is a 16-song compilation arranged in chronological order. Tracks include the instrumental "Mr. Scary"; "Walk Away", the sole studio cut on the 1988 live album, Beast from the East; "Mirror Mirror", from Don Dokken's 1990 solo album, Up from the Ashes; and "Too High to Fly", from the 1995 reunion album, Dysfunctional.

Track listing

References

1999 greatest hits albums
Dokken compilation albums
Elektra Records compilation albums